was a town located in Kōnu District, Hiroshima Prefecture, Japan.

As of 2003, the town had an estimated population of 3,114 and a density of 47.78 persons per km². The total area was 65.17 km².

On April 1, 2004, Kōnu, along with the towns of Kisa, Mirasaka and Miwa, and the villages of Funo, Kimita and Sakugi (all from Futami District), was merged with the expanded city of Miyoshi and no longer exists as an independent municipality.

The main street of Kōnu also known as "Carter Street", named for US president Jimmy Carter after his visit in the 1990s.

Places of interest
 Jimmy Carter Civic Center
 Susa Shrine
 Shoganji Temple

External links
 Official website of Miyoshi in Japanese

Dissolved municipalities of Hiroshima Prefecture